Shamrock Township is one of eighteen townships in Callaway County, Missouri, USA.  As of the 2010 census, its population was 413.

History
Shamrock Township was created between 1876 and 1897, per official county maps from these two years, from the northeast 1/4 (approximately) of what before then was a much larger Nine Mile Prairie Township.
It's named for the shamrock, a national symbol of Ireland.

Geography

The streams of Appling Branch, Bachelor Creek, Brushy Branch, Harrison Creek, Heat String Creek and Morris Branch run through this township, which also contains three cemeteries named Augusta, Chatman, and Sawyers.

The township is bordered on the west by Jackson Township (Auxvasse), on the south by Nine Mile Prairie Township (Williamsburg), on the north by Audrain County, and on the east by Montgomery County.

References

 USGS Geographic Names Information System (GNIS)

External links
 US-Counties.com
 City-Data.com

Townships in Callaway County, Missouri
Jefferson City metropolitan area
Townships in Missouri